Sharifa Fatima (d. during or after 1461; sharifa is an honorific, her proper name being Fatima bint al-Hassan) was a female Zaydi Sayyid chief in 15th century Yemen.

She allegedly conquered Sa'dah and Najran. She was the granddaughter of Zaydi imam Al-Nasir Muhammad Salah al-Din.

Life
Fatima was the daughter of Hasan and the paternal granddaughter of imam Al-Nasir Muhammad Salah al-Din (d. 1391). She married her cousin an-Nasir Muhammad, son of imam Al-Mansur Ali bin Salah ad-Din (d. 1436). The couple had one child, a daughter named Badr.

In 1436, her uncle and father-in-law the imam died of the plague, and was succeeded by her spouse, who however died himself shortly after. As he lacked male heirs, Sharifa Fatima herself came to be in a position of power. The Zaydi, however, could not accept a woman in the position of imam, and therefore chose her distant relative Al-Mahdi Salah ad-Din as imam: she also married him.

Her spouse was, however, challenged in his position as imam by two other distant relations: Al-Mutawakkil al-Mutahhar and Al-Mansur an-Nasir. Her spouse was captured by Al-Mansur an-Nasir, and died in captivity in 1445. Fatima herself escaped captivity and established herself as an independent ruler with her base in Dhofar and Saada. During this period, she was the de facto leader of her own fraction of the Zaydi's.

When Al-Mansur an-Nasir failed to defeat her, they made peace by an alliance symbolized by marriage between Al-Mansur an-Nasir and her daughter Badr. In 1453, she executed Cheikh Saad Hasan bin Muhammad accused of planning to join Al-Mansur an-Nasir against her. The brother of the executed sided with Al-Mansur an-Nasir, who in 1456 successfully sieged Saad and took her as prisoner to Sana'a.

In 1461, Sana'a was taken by Al-Mutawakkil al-Mutahhar, who took both her as well as Al-Mansur an-Nasir prisoner. Shortly after, the castle was stormed by the followers of Al-Mansur an-Nasir. It is not mentioned what happened to Fatima, it is only stated that she died.

Notes

References

Further reading

External links
"Warriors: Asian Women in Asian Society" from Colorq.org
"Women in Power 1450-1500" from Guide2womenleaders.com

15th-century women rulers
Women in 15th-century warfare
Women in war in the Middle East
Year of birth missing
Year of death missing
Rassid dynasty
Female Islamic religious leaders
Arab women in war